Boter Kothani Vav, also known as Mehsana Vav or Interi Vav, is a stepwell located in Mehsana, Gujarat, India.

History
The stepwell was constructed during the reign of Mughal emperor Aurangzeb. An inscription dated Samvat 1731 (1674 CE) in Persian and Devnagari scripts states that it was commissioned by Shah Gokaldas from Laghu Shakha of Shrimali caste, and his mother Manabai for public welfare. Gokaldas is a son of Virji who is a son of Vaka and grandson of Tejpal, as mentioned in the inscription.

Repaired and renovated during the Gaekwad rule, it became neglected and polluted. It was cleaned by the Mehsana Municipality in 2013. It was cleaned again and its water was approved for use in gardens in 2020.

Architecture
It is located near Bhimnath Mahadev temple in Para area. It is constructed of bricks and sandstone. It is known as Boter Kothani Vav, literally the stepwell with 72 cells.

Gallery

See also 
 Rajmahal, Mehsana
 Para Lake
 Nagalpur Lake

References

Stepwells in Gujarat
Mehsana
Tourist attractions in Mehsana district
Buildings and structures completed in 1674
Monuments and memorials in Gujarat